Pablo Daniel Suárez Barreiro (born 25 April 1984 in Vigo, Galicia) is a Spanish professional footballer who plays as a left back.

External links

1984 births
Living people
Footballers from Vigo
Spanish footballers
Association football defenders
Segunda División B players
Tercera División players
Celta de Vigo B players
Burgos CF footballers
Benidorm CF footballers
Zamora CF footballers
Pontevedra CF footballers
CD Castellón footballers
Cypriot First Division players
Cypriot Second Division players
Doxa Katokopias FC players
Olympiakos Nicosia players
Alki Oroklini players
Karmiotissa FC players
Spanish expatriate footballers
Expatriate footballers in Cyprus
Spanish expatriate sportspeople in Cyprus